Barry Alan Thompson (28 December 1947 – 13 June 2006) was a New Zealand rugby union player. A prop, Thompson represented Canterbury at a provincial level, and was a member of the New Zealand national side, the All Blacks, in 1979. He played eight matches for the All Blacks including two games against Argentina and one against Italy, but they were not recognized as full internationals by the New Zealand Rugby Union. He later served on the Waimakariri District Council from 1992 to 2001.

References

1947 births
2006 deaths
People from Oxford, New Zealand
People educated at Rangiora High School
New Zealand rugby union players
New Zealand international rugby union players
Canterbury rugby union players
Rugby union props
Local politicians in New Zealand
20th-century New Zealand politicians
Rugby union players from Canterbury, New Zealand